The 2011 Balearic Island Council elections were held on Sunday, 22 May 2011, to elect the 9th Island Councils of Mallorca and Menorca and the 2nd Island Councils of Formentera and Ibiza. All 72 seats in the four Island Councils were up for election. The elections were held simultaneously with regional elections in thirteen autonomous communities and local elections all throughout Spain.

Opinion polls
The tables below list voting intention estimates in reverse chronological order, showing the most recent first and using the dates when the survey fieldwork was done, as opposed to the date of publication. Where the fieldwork dates are unknown, the date of publication is given instead. The highest percentage figure in each polling survey is displayed with its background shaded in the leading party's colour. If a tie ensues, this is applied to the figures with the highest percentages. The "Lead" column on the right shows the percentage-point difference between the parties with the highest percentages in a given poll. When available, seat projections are also displayed below the voting estimates in a smaller font.

Formentera polling

Ibiza polling

Mallorca polling

Menorca polling

Island Council control
The following table lists party control in the Island Councils. Gains for a party are displayed with the cell's background shaded in that party's colour.

Islands

Formentera

Ibiza

Mallorca

Menorca

See also
2011 Balearic regional election
Results breakdown of the 2011 Spanish local elections (Balearic Islands)

Notes

References
Opinion poll sources

Other

Balearic
2011